Palomonte (Campanian:  or ) is a town and comune in the province of Salerno in the Campania region of south-western Italy. Palomonte's population is of 4.133 as of 2009.

References

Cities and towns in Campania
Localities of Cilento